Futbol Club Barcelona is a professional association football club based in Barcelona, Catalonia, Spain. The first full-time manager of Barcelona was Miles Barron.

Pep Guardiola is the most successful manager in terms of trophies. In 2009, Guardiola's first full year in charge, Barcelona became the first Spanish club to win the continental treble of La Liga, the Copa del Rey and the Champions League. Later that year, they became the first football team to achieve the sextuple, comprising the aforementioned treble, the Supercopa de España, the UEFA Super Cup and the FIFA Club World Cup.

The second most successful Barcelona manager in terms of trophies won is Johan Cruyff, who won four La Liga titles, one Copa del Rey, three Supercopa de España, one UEFA Cup Winners' Cup, one European Cup and one European Super Cup in his 8-year reign as manager.

List of managers 

During the first 29 years of Barcelona's existence, from 1899 to 1928, Spain did not have a national football league. Barcelona competed in the championship of the Catalonia region, the winners of which qualified for the Copa del Rey along with the other regional champions.

In February 1929, Spain's first national football league was formed, with Barcelona among the founding members. The club also competed in the Campionat de Catalunya (Catalan Championship) until it was abandoned in 1940. The Copa del Rey continued alongside La Liga. Clubs continued to qualify for it based on their placings in the regional championships until 1940, when it became open to all teams in the top two divisions of La Liga and selected other teams.

References

External links 
List of FC Barcelona Managers at fcbarcelona.com
El Mundo Deportivo

Managers
 
Barcelona